The 2004–05 Austrian Football First League season was the 31st season of second level league football in Austria. It was the third season that it used the name Red Zac First League.

Team movements

Promoted to Bundesliga
FC Wacker Tirol

Relegated from Bundesliga
FC Kärnten

Promoted from Regionalliga
SC Rheindorf Altach
FC Gratkorn

Relegated to Regionalliga
FC Lustenau
BSV Juniors

Teams

Table

External links
 RSSSF Link
 Weltfussball.de
  Kicker.de

2. Liga (Austria) seasons
Austria
2004–05 in Austrian football